Volkan Canalioğlu (born 1950, Trabzon, Turkey) is a Turkish politician who served as mayor of Trabzon from 2004 to 2009.

In 2009 he was the Mayoral candidate of the Republican People's Party (CHP) in Trabzon. Although he was successful, he was ineligible to serve a further term as Mayor.

Biography
He was born in Trabzon - Hizirbey (Sotka). He studied in Kaledibi primary school, Karma primary school and Trabzon High School. Then he graduated from Black Sea Technical University, in 1971. In 1972 he started his career as a teacher.  In 1975 while he was a teacher, he joined the army. After he finished his job as a soldier in Isparta, he started his job as a teacher again. He worked at Trabzon Karma Primary School, Trabzon Industrial Professional High School and Erzurum Poet Nafi Primary School and Mustafa Necati Primary school where he worked as a teacher and deputy manager. While he was manager at Trabzon Derecik Primary school in 1983 he was chosen to be deputy manager of Trabzon Ministry of National Education.  In 1985, he was chosen to be manager of Trabzon's Culture and Tourism department. In 1989 he was chosen to be manager of Trabzon's Ministry of Tourism. He worked as vice governor in Trabzon 3 period. After that, he was elected Mayor of Trabzon. In 2009, he couldn't be elected and since 2009, Orhan Fevzi Gümrükçüoğlu has worked in Trabzon as Mayor.

Awards
 1970 Trabzon Tradition Awards
 1972 Yenigün Newspaper Amateur Sportsman of Year
 2000 The best manager and director

Membership 
 Black Sea Technical University Aware - founder member,
 Great Süleyman Aware - founder member,
 Tourism Aware,
 Trabzon High School's old students association, 
 Tourism association - manager,
 Trabzon handicapped children protect association,
 leucemiad children protect association - manager member,
 Trabzon Sportif Club - member of management,
 Turkey Ministry of Youth and Sport,

References

Mayors of Trabzon
Living people
1950 births
Contemporary Republican People's Party (Turkey) politicians